The women's freestyle 59 kilograms is a competition featured at the 2022 World Wrestling Championships, and was held in Štark Arena, Belgrade, Serbia on 14 and 15 September 2022. The qualification rounds were held on 14 September while medal matches were held on the 2nd day of the competition.

This freestyle wrestling competition consists of a single-elimination tournament, with a repechage used to determine the winner of two bronze medals. The two finalists face off for gold and silver medals. Each wrestler who loses to one of the two finalists moves into the repechage, culminating in a pair of bronze medal matches featuring the semifinal losers each facing the remaining repechage opponent from their half of the bracket.

European champion Anastasia Nichita of Moldova won the gold medal after edging Norway's former European champion Grace Bullen from Norway 4–1 after six minutes.

Japan's Sakura Motoki won by fall versus China's Zhang Qi in one of the bronze medal bouts, the scoreline was 7–0 at the time, while Poland's Jowita Wrzesień recorded a 4–2 victory on points over Mongolia's Bat-Erdeniin Erdenesuvd to also walk away with a bronze medal.

Results
Legend
F — Won by fall

Main bracket

Repechage

Final standing

References

External links
Official website

Women's freestyle 59 kg
2022 in women's sport wrestling